This is a complete list of androgens/anabolic steroids (AAS) and formulations that are approved by the  and available in the United States. AAS like testosterone are used in androgen replacement therapy (ART), a form of hormone replacement therapy (HRT), and for other indications.

Testosterone and esters
Testosterone (unmodified/non-esterified) is available in the following formulations:

 Oral: Jatenzo (as testosterone undecanoate, a prodrug of testosterone)
 Buccal tablets: Striant
 Intranasal gels: Natesto
 Transdermal:
 Gels: Androgel, Fortesta, Testim, Testosterone (generic)
 Solutions: Axiron, Testosterone (generic)
 Patches: Androderm, Testoderm (discontinued), Testoderm TTS (discontinued), Testosterone (generic)
 Injectable oil solutions (as prodrugs of testosterone):
 Testosterone cypionate (Depo-Testosterone, Testosterone Cypionate (generic))
 Testosterone enanthate (Delatestryl, Testosterone Enanthate (generic))
 Testosterone undecanoate (Aveed)
 Subcutaneous pellet implants: Testopel

Testosterone propionate (Testosterone Propionate (generic)), testosterone cypionate/estradiol cypionate (brand name Depo-Testadiol), testosterone enanthate/estradiol valerate (brand name Ditate-DS) as oil solutions for intramuscular injection were previously available but were discontinued.

Androstanolone (dihydrotestosterone; DHT) and esters are not available in the United States.

Anabolic steroids

Oral, buccal, and/or sublingual
 Fluoxymesterone (Android-F, Halotestin, Ora-Testryl)
 Methyltestosterone (Android 5, Android 10, Android 25, Metandren, Oreton, Oreton Methyl, Testred, Virilon)
 Oxandrolone (Oxandrin)
 Oxymetholone (Anadrol-50)

(Note that while the above anabolic steroids remain available in at least one formulation, many of the above-listed brand names have been discontinued.)

Ethylestrenol (Maxibolin) and stanozolol (Winstrol) were previously available but were discontinued.

Intramuscular injection
Drostanolone propionate (Drolban), nandrolone decanoate (Deca-Durabolin), and nandrolone phenylpropionate (Durabolin) were previously available but were discontinued.

Miscellaneous
 Danazol (Danocrine)

Gestrinone and tibolone are also notable androgenic agents but have not been marketed in the United States.

See also
 List of sex-hormonal medications available in the United States
 List of androgens/anabolic steroids
 List of androgen esters

Notes

References
 

Androgens and anabolic steroids